Matthew John Peter Minagall (born 13 November 1971) is a former cricketer who played 13 matches of first-class cricket for South Australia from 1991 to 1998.

Minagall was a left-arm wrist-spinner who was never able to establish a place in the South Australian team. He had one outstanding match, when he took 7 for 152 and 4 for 111 against Tasmania in Adelaide in 1994-95.

References

External links

Matthew Minagall at CricketArchive

1971 births
Living people
Australian cricketers
South Australia cricketers
Cricketers from Adelaide